Baiterek ("tall poplar tree") is a monument and observation tower in Astana, the capital city of Kazakhstan. A tourist attraction popular with foreign visitors and Kazakhs, it is emblematic of the city, which became capital of the country in 1997. The tower is located on Nurjol Boulevard, and is considered a symbol of post-independence Kazakhstan.

Design 

The project was launched on the initiative of the first President of the Republic of Kazakhstan Nursultan Nazarbayev; the architect of the project is Akmurza Rustembekov. 

The 105 meters tall structure rises from a wide flat base within a raised plaza. It consists of a narrow cylindrical shaft, surrounded by white branch-like girders that flare out near the top, supporting a gold-mirrored 22 meter  diameter sphere. The base contains a ticket booth and exhibition space, with two lifts rising within the shaft to the observation deck within the 'egg'. Entrances to the monument are sunk below eye level, reached by stairs from the surrounding plaza. 

The observation deck is 97 meters above ground level. It consists of two levels, one with 360 degree views of Astana and beyond, with a second, higher level, reached by a flight of stairs. The top level features a gilded hand print of the right hand of Nursultan Nazarbayev, the first President of independent Kazakhstan, mounted in an ornate pedestal. A plaque invites visitors to place a hand in the imprint and make a wish. Alongside the handprint, and also oriented in the direction of the presidential palace, is a wooden sculpture of a globe and 16 radiating segments, commemorating the Congress of Leaders of World and Traditional Religions, held several times in Astana.

Symbolism 

The monument was built as a symbol of the transfer of the capital from Alma-Ata to Akmola in 1997. 

The monument is meant to embody a folktale about a mythical tree of life and a magic bird of happiness: the bird, named Samruk, laid her egg in the crevice between two branches of the tree.

The significance of "Baiterek" as a symbol of a new stage in the life of the Kazakh people is emphasized by the artistic composition "Ayaly alakan" ( - "caring hands") with an imprint of the president's right hand, located at a height of 97 meters, which symbolizes 1997 - the year of the proclamation Astana as the new capital of the state and, accordingly, a new starting point in the history of the country.

Photo gallery

See also

Astana
Kazakhstan
History of Kazakhstan

References

External links
http://www.astanahotels.ru/eng/astana/bayterek.htm 
 Bayterek Tower from "Abasayyoh"

Buildings and structures in Astana
Towers in Kazakhstan
Foster and Partners buildings
Buildings and structures completed in 2002
Culture in Astana
Tourist attractions in Astana
Towers completed in 2002
Observation towers in Astana
Landmarks in Kazakhstan
Perceptions of religious imagery in natural phenomena
2002 establishments in Kazakhstan